James Bowie (9 July 1888 – 7 August 1972) was a Scottish football player and football administrator, who played for and was chairman of Rangers.

Playing career
Bowie began his career at Maryhill Juniors and joined Rangers in December 1910 from Queen's Park. He made his debut against Falkirk on 10 December 1910. During his time at the club he won six League championships and played in a total of 351 competitive games, scoring 70 goals.

Bowie won two Scotland caps in 1920, and also played in four wartime internationals. He retired in 1922.

Football administrator
After retiring, he became a club director in 1925 and served as chairman from 1934 until 1947. The circumstances for Bowie's departure as chairman were due to a boardroom coup, after he suggested that then manager Bill Struth retire, being that he was 71 years old.

He was also president of the Scottish Football League from 1939 to 1946.

Honours
 Scottish League: 1910–11, 1911–12, 1912–13, 1917–18, 1919–20, 1920–21
 Scottish Cup: Runner-up: 1920–21 
 Glasgow Cup: 1913–14, 1917–18, 1918–19

References

External links

Rangers Hall of Fame profile

1888 births
1972 deaths
Scottish footballers
People from Partick
Footballers from Glasgow
Rangers F.C. players
Maryhill F.C. players
Rangers F.C. chairmen
Queen's Park F.C. players
Scottish Football League players
Scottish Junior Football Association players
Chairmen and investors of football clubs in Scotland
Scotland international footballers
Scotland wartime international footballers
Association football wing halves
Association football inside forwards
Scottish Football League representative players
Scottish Football League
20th-century Scottish businesspeople